The suborder Myomorpha contains 1,524 species of mouse-like rodents, nearly a quarter of all mammal species.  Included are mice, rats, gerbils, hamsters, lemmings, and voles. They are grouped according to the structure of their jaws and molar teeth. They are characterized by their myomorphous zygomasseteric system, which means that both their medial and lateral masseter muscles are displaced forward, making them adept at gnawing. As in the hystricognathous rodents, the medial masseter muscle goes through the eye socket, a feature unique among mammals. Myomorphs are found worldwide (apart from Antarctica) in almost all land habitats. They are usually nocturnal seed-eaters.

Most myomorph species belong to the superfamily Muroidea: (hamsters, voles, lemmings, true mice, true rats, and gerbils).
Superfamily Muroidea
Family Platacanthomyidae (spiny dormice and Chinese pygmy dormice)
Family Spalacidae (blind mole-rats and bamboo rats)
Family Calomyscidae (mouse-like hamsters)
Family Nesomyidae (Malagasy mice and rats and African climbing mice)
Family Cricetidae (true hamsters, voles and lemmings)
Family Muridae (true rats, true mice and gerbils)
Superfamily Dipodoidea
Family Dipodidae (jerboas)
Family Sminthidae (birch mice)
Family Zapodidae (jumping mice)

Historically, the definition of the suborder Myomorpha has included one or both of:
Superfamily Geomyoidea (gophers and kangaroo rats)
Family Heteromyidae (kangaroo rats)
Family Geomyidae (gophers)
Superfamily Gliroidea (true dormice)
Family Gliridae

References

Carleton, M. D. and G. G. Musser. 2005. Order Rodentia. Pp745–752 in Mammal Species of the World A Taxonomic and Geographic Reference (D. E. Wilson and D. M. Reeder eds.). Baltimore, Johns Hopkins University Press.
Clutton-Brock, Juliet (ed.). 2004. Mouse-like Rodents. Pp150–159 in Animal (David Burnley ed.). London, Dorling Kindersley.

Rodent taxonomy
Mammal suborders
Extant Eocene first appearances
Taxa named by Johann Friedrich von Brandt